The following are the Pulitzer Prizes for 1926.

Journalism awards
Public Service:
Columbus Enquirer Sun, for the service which it rendered in its brave and energetic fight against the Ku Klux Klan; against the enactment of a law barring the teaching of evolution; against dishonest and incompetent public officials and for justice to the Negro and against lynching.
Reporting:
William Burke Miller of Louisville Courier-Journal, for his work in connection with the story of the trapping in Sand Cave, Kentucky, of Floyd Collins. 
Editorial Writing:
Edward M. Kingsbury of The New York Times, for "The House of a Hundred Sorrows".

Editorial Cartooning:
D. R. Fitzpatrick of St. Louis Post-Dispatch, "The Laws of Moses and the Laws of Today".

Letters and Drama Awards
Novel:
Arrowsmith by Sinclair Lewis (Harcourt (publisher)) (declined)
Drama:
Craig's Wife by George Kelly (Little, Brown and Company)
History:
A History of the United States, Vol. VI: The War for Southern Independence (1849–1865) by Edward Channing (Macmillan Publishers)
Biography or Autobiography:
The Life of Sir William Osler by Harvey Cushing (Oxford University Press)
Poetry:
What's O'Clock by Amy Lowell (Houghton Mifflin Harcourt)

References

External links
Pulitzer Prizes for 1926

Pulitzer Prizes by year
Pulitzer Prize
Pulitzer Prize